Metarbela cremorna is a moth in the family Cossidae. It is found in Ghana.

References

Natural History Museum Lepidoptera generic names catalog

Endemic fauna of Ghana
Metarbelinae
Moths described in 1920